Hellmaster (also known as Soulstealer) is a 1992 American horror film written and directed by Douglas Shulze, and starring John Saxon. The plot follows a psychotic college professor who uses unsuspecting students as laboratory rats, injecting them with a drug that mutates them into brutal killers.

Plot
Part of a secret government eugenics project, crazed biochemistry professor Jones (John Saxon) committed terrible crimes on his college campus in the late 1960s before one of his colleagues burned the college to put a deadly end to his spree. Jones is presumed dead, but a series of murders twenty years later raises questions of whether he has somehow managed to return. In actuality, Jones's drug experiments have turned him into a superhuman. Having teleported himself to safety during the fire, he has been living underground continuing his experiments. With an injection, he is able to turn people into mutants who will follow his will. With the help of his zombie-like army, Jones plans to access his stores of his "Nietzsche Drug" in the catacombs beneath the campus. Standing against him are three people: a psychic, a reporter and a woman who has already survived one supernatural attack. The psychic determines that she herself must take the Nietzsche Drug so she can face the mad professor and his mutant slaves.

Cast
 John Saxon as Professor Jones
 David Emge as Reporter
 Jeff Rector as Jesse
 Amy Raasch as Shelley
 Edward Stevens as Drake
 Sean Sweeney as Joel
 Melissa Zafarana as Tracy
 Jim Riethmiller as Harrold
 Sarah Barkoff as Little Girl

Home media

The film's initial home video release VHS was distributed through AIP in 1992.

The film was released on DVD on September 19, 2006 and includes audio commentary from director Shulze and one of the producers, along with a conceptual art gallery, and a behind-the-scenes gallery.

References

External links
 
 
 New York Times overview
 

1992 films
1992 horror films
1990s psychological thriller films
American supernatural horror films
1990s English-language films
1990s American films